Hanka Ordonówna or Ordonka (born Maria Anna Pietruszyńska; 4 August 1902 in Warsaw – 8 September 1950 in Beirut) was a Polish singer, dancer and actress. She began her career at the age of 16 in a Warsaw cabaret named Sfinks and then the theater Wesoły Ul in Lublin under the stage name Anna Ordon. singing hits still popular today: "O mój rozmarynie", "Rozkwitały pęki białych róż", and "Ułani, ułani".

When this cabaret closed, Hanka Ordonówna moved to Warsaw and worked at the cabaret Miraż, where she was spotted by Fryderyk Jarosy, director of the Warsaw cabaret Qui Pro Quo; it was under his guidance that she became a star, recording "Miłość ci wszystko wybaczy" (song by Henryk Wars and Julian Tuwim) in the 1933 movie Szpieg w masce (A Masked Spy). Another hit was Marian Hemar's Jakieś małe nic ("Some Little Nothing"), 1934.

In 1931, she married Count Michał Tyszkiewicz, who wrote many of her songs. Though a Countess, she continued to perform on a cabaret stage, and even rode a horse in a circus revue. She developed lung disease, which plagued her for the rest of her life. She died in 1950 in Beirut.

Selected filmography
 The Little Eagle (1927)

References

External links

 
 
 Article about Hanka Ordonówna in Polish
 Biography in Polish
 Pictures

1902 births
1950 deaths
Polish stage actresses
Polish film actresses
Polish silent film actresses
20th-century Polish actresses
Actresses from Warsaw
Musicians from Warsaw
Polish cabaret performers
20th-century Polish women singers
20th-century comedians